Bamaluzole is a GABA receptor agonist. It was patented as an anticonvulsant by Merck but was never marketed.

See also 
 Imidazopyridine

References

Anticonvulsants
Chloroarenes
GABAA receptor agonists
Imidazopyridines
Abandoned drugs